Biomesotherapy is an alternative therapy practice that combines homotoxicology, mesotherapy, and acupuncture. Saline solution and homeopathic formulations are injected subcutaneously at specific acupuncture or trigger points, and homeopathic formulations are administered orally during treatment sessions. Biomesotherapy is used for pain management and general well-being.

References
This article incorporates public domain text from the CDC as cited.

Cosmetics
Alternative medical treatments
Pseudoscience